Kryptolebias is a genus of killifish in the family Rivulidae mostly native to warm parts of South America but with one species (K. marmoratus) found north through the Caribbean region to the Gulf Coast states of the United States. They are non-annual killifish. The genus was originally name Cryptolebias but this name was pre-occupied by a genus of fossil fish.

Species

There are currently 8 recognized species in this genus:

 Kryptolebias brasiliensis Valenciennes, 1821
 Kryptolebias campelloi W. J. E. M. Costa, 1990
 Kryptolebias caudomarginatus Seegers, 1984
 Kryptolebias gracilis W. J. E. M. Costa, 2007
 Kryptolebias hermaphroditus W. J. E. M. Costa, 2011
 Kryptolebias marmoratus Poey, 1880 (Mangrove rivulus)
 Kryptolebias ocellatus R. F. Hensel, 1868
 Kryptolebias sepia Vermeulen & Hrbek, 2005

References

Rivulidae
Fish of South America
Tropical fish
Freshwater fish genera